Uriel Trocki (אוריאל טרוצקי; November 28, 1996) is a Uruguayan-Israeli basketball player who last played for Ironi Nes Ziona of the Israeli Basketball Premier League. He plays the forward and center positions.

Biography
Trocki was born in Montevideo, Uruguay. He is Jewish, and was bar mitzvah in 2010. When he was 13 years old, he and his family immigrated to Israel. His hometown is Kfar Saba, Israel. He is 6' 7" (201 cm) tall, and weighs 224 pounds (102 kg).

Professional career
He played for Hapoel Kfar Saba. Trocki played from 2018 to 2020 for Maccabi Raanana. In 2019-20 he averaged 10.4 points, 6.5 rebounds, and 1.6 assists per game.

In June 2020 Hapoel Holon of the Israeli Basketball Premier League signed Trocki. 

On January 1, 2021, he has signed with Ironi Nes Ziona of the Israeli Basketball Premier League.

National team career 
Trocki played for the Uruguay national basketball team at the 2019 Pan American Games in Peru.

References

External links
Twitter page
Instagram page

Living people
1996 births
Hapoel Holon players
Hapoel Kfar Saba B.C. players
Ironi Nes Ziona B.C. players
Israeli men's basketball players
Jewish men's basketball players
Jewish Uruguayan sportspeople
Maccabi Ra'anana players
People from Kfar Saba
Sportspeople from Montevideo
Uruguayan expatriate basketball people in Israel
Uruguayan men's basketball players
Uruguayan people of Israeli descent